The National Intelligence Directorate is a national intelligence estimate authority to integrate foreign, military and domestic intelligence in the national interests of Pakistan. The NID's goals to manage and pool effective intelligence works undertaken by both civilian and defence intelligence agencies of the country, and has aims to increase intelligence sharing with the four provinces. 

The NID is headed by the Minister of Interior.

See also
 The intelligence community of Pakistan
 Federal Investigation Agency (FIA)
 Inter-Services Intelligence (ISI)
 Air Intelligence (AI)
 Military Intelligence (MI) 
 Naval Intelligence (NI) 
 Criminal Investigation Department (CID)
 Directorate-General of Intelligence and Investigation (DGII)
 Financial Monitoring Unit (FMU)
 Intelligence Bureau (IB)
 National Crises Management Cell (NCMC)
 Anti-Extremist Cell (AEC)
 Special Security Unit (SSU)
 Anti-Narcotics Force (ANF)
 National Counter Terrorism Authority (NACTA)

References

External links
 Government of Pakistan

Pakistan federal departments and agencies
Pakistani intelligence agencies
2014 establishments in Pakistan
Government agencies established in 2014
Intelligence analysis agencies